Iván Romeo Abad (born 16 August 2003) is a Spanish cyclist, who currently rides for UCI WorldTeam .

Major results
2020
 4th Time trial, National Junior Road Championships
2021
 National Junior Road Championships
1st  Road race
1st  Time trial
 1st Stage 1 
2022
 7th Overall International Tour of Rhodes
1st  Young rider classification
 8th Time trial, UEC European Under-23 Road Championships
 9th Overall Flanders Tomorrow Tour

References

External links

2003 births
Living people
Spanish male cyclists
Sportspeople from Valladolid
Cyclists from Castile and León